Ellendale Public School District No. 40 is a school district with a single K-12 school, Ellendale Public School, in Ellendale, North Dakota. One division is Ellendale High School (EHS).

The district, located in Dickey County, includes Ellendale, Forbes, Fullerton, and Monango.

History
In 1939 the gymnasium was built, and in 1957 an elementary school was built.

On April 27, 2010, there was an election scheduled for a school bond project to build a new school. The anticipated bond would be $4 million.

Operations
By 1985 it had a guidance counselor.

It has an annual publication, The Redbird. Its school newspaper is The Cardinal.

Curriculum
By 1985 it had special education, computer courses, and In 1985 the school district added its first foreign language, German, to its course offerings.

Athletics
In 1918 the first athletic program, boys' basketball, began at the school. By 1985 it also had a basketball team for girls and American football.

References

External links
 Ellendale Public School

School districts in North Dakota
Education in Dickey County, North Dakota